The Rick & Ruth Breakfast Show was RTÉ 2fm's breakfast show which began after Ryan Tubridy's The Full Irish ended and ran until 26 September 2005. Presented by Rick O'Shea and Ruth Scott, the show was axed after six months in August 2005 when it was blamed for losing The Gerry Ryan Show 40,000 listeners to Today FM's Ray D'Arcy. The show was replaced by Marty Whelan who presented Marty in the Morning until his subsequent replacement by Colm & Jim-Jim who, until October 2010, presented The Colm & Jim-Jim Breakfast Show. Scott was moved to the weekday 16:00 - 18:00 slot, whilst O'Shea returned to the late night 22:00 - 00:00 shift he had previously occupied.

References

External links
 Rick & Ruth archive

Irish breakfast radio shows
RTÉ 2fm programmes